The Complete Blue Note Fifties Sessions is a compilatation of saxophonist, composer and bandleader Gil Mellé's recordings from 1952 to 1956 which were released on the Blue Note label. They were originally released as four 10 inch LPs; Gil Mellé Quintet/Sextet (which featured Rudy Van Gelder's first issued recordings); Gil Mellé Quintet with Urbie Green and Tal Farlow; Gil Mellé Quartet featuring Lou Mecca; 5 Impressions of Color; and a 12 inch LP Patterns in Jazz.

Reception

Allmusic awarded the album 4½ stars and Richard S. Ginell stated "this collection leaves little doubt that he was (and remains) a marvelous saxophonist and an intriguing composer who hasn't been given his due". On All About Jazz John Sharpe said "These extremely rare sessions contain a mix of straight bop, a number of standards and many of Melle's unique third stream compositions. Melle's use of a guitar (Tal Farlow, Lou Mecca and Joe Cinderella) in place of a piano was seen as a bold, innovative step ... Although these discs do contain some sonic imperfections they remain a valuable document of one of the most cerebral and creative figures in jazz".

Track listing
All compositions by Gil Mellé except where noted

Disc One:
 "Four Moons" – 2:23 Originally released on Gil Mellé Quintet/Sextet
 "The Gears" – 3:06 Originally released on Gil Mellé Quintet/Sextet
 "Mars" – 2:46 Originally released on Gil Mellé Quintet/Sextet
 "Sunset Concerto" – 2:03 Originally released on Gil Mellé Quintet/Sextet
 "Cyclotron" – 3:13 Originally released on Gil Mellé Quintet/Sextet
 "October" – 3:41 Originally released on Gil Mellé Quintet/Sextet
 "Under Capricorn" – 2:58 Originally released on Gil Mellé Quintet/Sextet	
 "Venus" – 3:40 Originally released on Gil Mellé Quintet/Sextet	
 "Lover Man" (Jimmy Davis, Ram Ramirez, Jimmy Sherman) – 5:55 Originally released on Gil Mellé Quintet with Urbie Green and Tal Farlow	
 "Spellbound" (Miklós Rózsa) – 3:18 Originally released on Gil Mellé Quintet with Urbie Green and Tal Farlow	
 "Transition" – 5:12 Originally released on Gil Mellé Quintet with Urbie Green and Tal Farlow	
 "A Lion Lives Here" – 3:50 Originally released on Gil Mellé Quintet with Urbie Green and Tal Farlow
 "Timepiece" – 3:10 Originally released on Gil Mellé Quintet with Urbie Green and Tal Farlow
 "Gingersnap" – 3:17 Originally released on Gil Mellé Quintet with Urbie Green and Tal Farlow
 "The Nearness of You" (Hoagy Carmichael, Ned Washington) – 4:17 Previously unreleased
 "Lullaby of Birdland" (George Shearing, George David Weiss) – 3:46 Originally released on Gil Mellé Quartet featuring Lou Mecca	
 "Ballad for Guitar" – 3:53 Originally released on Gil Mellé Quartet featuring Lou Mecca
 "Metropolitan" – 2:50 Originally released on Gil Mellé Quartet featuring Lou Mecca	
 "Newport News" – 4:55 Originally released on Gil Mellé Quartet featuring Lou Mecca	
Recorded at Van Gelder Studio, Hackensack, New Jersey on March 2, 1952 (tracks 1-4), January 31, 1953 (tracks 5-8), October 25, 1953 (tracks 9-15) and September 5, 1954 (tracks 16-19)

Disc Two: 
 "Summertime" (George Gershwin) – 3:59 Originally released on Gil Mellé Quartet featuring Lou Mecca	
 "Quadrille for Moderns" – 3:31 Originally released on Gil Mellé Quartet featuring Lou Mecca	
 "Five Impressions of Color: Spectrum Violet/Sea Green/Royal Blue/Ebony" – 12:37 Originally released on 5 Impressions of Color	
 "Life Begins at Midnight" – 4:24 Originally released on 5 Impressions of Color
 "Night Train to Wildwood" – 4:10 Originally released on 5 Impressions of Color	
 "Threadneedle Street" – 4:15 Originally released on 5 Impressions of Color	
 "Weird Valley" – 5:13 Originally released on Patterns in Jazz
 "The Set Break" – 4:48 Originally released on Patterns in Jazz	
 "Moonlight in Vermont" (John Blackburn, Karl Suessdorf) – 4:52 Originally released on Patterns in Jazz	
 "Long Ago (And Far Away)" (Ira Gershwin, Jerome Kern) – 4:32 Originally released on Patterns in Jazz	
 "The Arab Barber Blues" – 9:05 Originally released on Patterns in Jazz	
 "Nice Questions" – 8:17 Originally released on Patterns in Jazz
Recorded at Van Gelder Studio, Hackensack, New Jersey on September 5, 1954 (tracks 1 & 2), February 27, 1955 (tracks 3-6) and April 1, 1956 (tracks 7-12).

Personnel
Gil Mellé  – tenor saxophone, baritone saxophone
Eddie Bert – trombone (Disc One: tracks 1-8, Disc Two: tracks 7-12)
Urbie Green – trombone (Disc One: tracks 9-15)
Don Butterfield – tuba (Disc Two: tracks 3-6)
George Wallington – piano (Disc One: tracks 1-4)
Tal Farlow – guitar (Disc One: tracks 5-15)
Lou Mecca – guitar (Disc One: tracks 16-19, Disc Two: tracks 1-6)
Joe Cinderella – guitar (Disc Two: tracks 7-12)
Red Mitchell – bass (Disc One: tracks 1-4)
Clyde Lombardi – bass (Disc One: tracks 5-15)
Bill Phillips – bass (Disc One: tracks 16-19, Disc Two: tracks 1-6)
Oscar Pettiford – bass (Disc Two: tracks 7-12)
Joe Manning – vibraphone (Disc One: tracks 1-4)
Max Roach – drums (Disc One: tracks 1-4)
Joe Morello – drums (Disc One: tracks 5-15)
Vinnie Thomas – drums (Disc One: tracks 16-19, Disc Two: tracks 1-6)
Ed Thigpen – drums (Disc Two: tracks 7-12)
Monica Dell – vocals (Disc One: tracks 2-4)

References

Blue Note Records compilation albums
Gil Mellé compilation albums
1998 albums
Albums produced by Alfred Lion
Albums recorded at Van Gelder Studio